Jill Churchill (born Janice Young Brooks January 11, 1943 in Kansas City, Missouri) is an American author, winner of the Agatha and Macavity Awards for her first Jane Jeffry novel and featured in Great Women Mystery Writers (2007).

Biography
Churchill earned a degree in education from the University of Kansas in 1965 and then studied at the University of Missouri-Kansas City before teaching in elementary school for some years. Between 1978 and 1992, she was book reviewer for the Kansas City Star. Now divorced, she lives in Kansas.

Writer
She published several historical novels under her real name before introducing a new series in 1989. This mystery series follows Jane Jeffry, a widow with three children living in suburban Chicago. With her neighbor and best friend Shelley Nowack, she gets caught up in murder cases. These often involve Mel Van Dyne, a police detective introduced in the first novel. The novel titles are puns on literary works and reflect Jeffry's cozy domestic life which she leads between crime-solving capers.

In 1999, Churchill began a new mystery series set during the Great Depression, which features siblings Robert and Lily Brewster who live in New York. They've inherited a house from their great-uncle, which they run as a guest house to earn money.

Published books

Non-fiction
Kings and Queens: The Plantagenets of England, as Janice Young Brooks (T. Nelson, 1975)– children's non-fiction,

Jane Jeffry series
 Grime and Punishment (1989)
 A Farewell to Yarns (1991)
 A Quiche Before Dying (1993)
 The Class Menagerie (1994)
 A Knife to Remember (1994)
 From Here to Paternity (1995)
 Silence of the Hams (1996)
 War and Peas (1996)
 Fear of Frying (1997)
 The Merchant of Menace (1998)
 A Groom With a View (1999)
 Mulch Ado About Nothing (2000)
 The House of Seven Mabels (2002)
 Bell, Book, and Scandal (2003)
 A Midsummer Night's Scream (2004)
 The Accidental Florist (2007)

Grace and Favor series
 Anything Goes (1999)
 In the Still of the Night (2000)
 Someone to Watch Over Me (2001)
 Love for Sale (2003)
 It Had to Be You (2004)
 Who's Sorry Now? (2005)
 Smoke Gets in Your Eyes (2013)

Other fiction

As Janice Young Brooks
 In Love's Own Time (1977)
 Forbidden Fires (1977)
 Seventrees (1981)
 Still the Mighty Waters (1983)
 Our Lives, Our Fortunes (1984)
 Glory (1985)
 The Circling Years (1986)
 Season of Desire (1986)
 Crown Sable (1986)
 Cinnamon Wharf (1988)
 Guests of the Emperor (1990)
 The Herron Heritage (1992)

As Amanda Singer
Ozark Legacy (1975)

As Valerie Vayle
Lady of Fire (1980)
Seaflame (1980)
Oriana (1981)

References

External links

  (1975–1990)
  (1988–2007)
 Warning. Sources differ concerning which of the five other names is sometimes or consistently used for the publication of works written or co-written by Brooks. 

1943 births
Living people
20th-century American novelists
21st-century American novelists
Agatha Award winners
American mystery writers
American women novelists
Macavity Award winners
Writers from Kansas City, Missouri
University of Kansas alumni
University of Missouri–Kansas City alumni
Writers from Kansas
Women mystery writers
20th-century American women writers
21st-century American women writers
Novelists from Missouri